The Men's 1 km time trial competition at the 2018 UCI Track Cycling World Championships was held on 4 March 2018.

Results

Qualifying
The top 8 riders qualified for the final.

Final
The final was held at 14:16.

References

Men's 1 km time trial
UCI Track Cycling World Championships – Men's 1 km time trial